"Send Me a Lover" is a song performed by American singer, songwriter, and actress Taylor Dayne. It is written by Rick Hahn and George Thatcher, and released on September 6, 1993, as the second single from her third album, Soul Dancing (1993). In the United States, it peaked at number 50 on the Billboard Hot 100 and number 19 on the Hot Adult Contemporary Tracks. In Canada, "Send Me a Lover" reached number 24 on the Top Singles chart and number eight on the Adult Contemporary chart.

Critical reception
Jose F. Promis from AllMusic felt that the song "stands as one of Dayne's finest moments". Larry Flick from Billboard declared it as "a heartbroken power ballad that will connect with anyone who has suffered from unrequited love. Bombastic production builds from soft to earth-shaking in the blink of an eye, and Taylor matches the arrangement with a performance that might shatter a glass or two. A better radio bet than the previous "Can't Get Enough of Your Love"." Mike Joyce from The Washington Post stated that one listen to ballads like "Send Me a Lover", "with stirring choruses, modulations and melismatic twists, is enough to convince you that Dayne knows the ins and outs of the idiom."

Formats and track listings
 US CD maxi single
"Send Me a Lover" – 4:28
"With Every Beat of My Heart" – 4:22
"Love Will Lead You Back" – 4:37
"If You Were Mine" – 5:01
"Someone Like You" – 3:50

Charts

Celine Dion version
Dion's version (with heavily revised verses and slightly altered chorus lyrics) was a "leftover" from the recording sessions of the Celine Dion album in 1992, which remained unreleased until 1994. It was offered for various benefit collections, mostly for women's causes. First it was released on the Kumbaya Album 1994. All proceeds from this CD went to support AIDS awareness and services. It also appeared on the In Between Dances (1995) (of which profits were given to research on breast cancer), The Power of Peace (1996) (to celebrate the 50 years of CARA), and Women for Women, Vol. 2 (1996) (another album to get funds for the research on breast cancer). It was also included as the B-side of the UK single "Pour que tu m'aimes encore" in 1995.

Dion's version was issued in the US in December 1996, as a radio single from the Women for Women, Vol. 2 album, released on September 17, 1996. It peaked at number 23 on the Hot Adult Contemporary Tracks.

Critical reception
Larry Flick from Billboard wrote, "Here's a wonderful song that Dion has contributed to The Power Of Peace, a fine 13-track compilation designed to raise money for CARE. Sharp ears will remember Taylor Dayne's hit version of this forlorn power ballad, which Dion dives into with white-knuckled power. AC listeners who cannot get enough of the Canadian diva will feast on this treat."

Charts

References

1993 songs
1993 singles
1996 singles
Arista Records singles
Celine Dion songs
Taylor Dayne songs